The Armenian national awakening resembles that of other non-Turkish ethnic groups during the rise of nationalism under the Ottoman Empire in development of ideas of nationalism, salvation and independence in Armenia, as the Ottoman Empire tried to cover the social needs by creating the Tanzimat era, the development of Ottomanism and First Constitutional Era. However, the coexistence of the communities (including Armenians) under Ottomanism proved to be a dysfunctional solution as did the Second Constitutional Era which also ignited the dissolution of the Ottoman Empire.

During the Armenian national awakening, "Armenian National Assembly" took over some of the regulations of temporal matters of the Ottoman Armenian Community from the Armenian Patriarchate. Among the Armenian elite, the idea of republicanism replaced the absolute monarchy of the Ottoman Dynasty, and establishment of the Armenian National Assembly in 1863 replaced the membership of the millet system. While it took World War I for the establishment of the First Armenian Republic, the Armenians had oscillated between the ideas of having an Armenian republic or an autonomous region within the empire during the history of Ottoman democracy, with organizations like the Social Democrat Hunchakian Party and Armenian Democratic Liberal Party (Ramgavar Party or Armenakan).

Origins

Prehistoric-Historic Era 
The discovery of Urartu has come to play a significant role in 19th and 20th-century Armenian nationalism.

Beyond the mostly accepted terms of the Armenian nationalism as given in the above paragraphs, the concept has come to include a range of interpretations of Prehistoric Armenia, including the link to the Iron Age kingdom of Urartu. The Armenians are the original inhabitants of the territory of what is named as historic Armenia. Identification with the distant glories of Urartu and its prehistoric forerunners, together with Mount Ararat has come to be a powerful symbol of Armenian ethnicity especially among the diaspora.

The idea which claims people living under Urartu were consciously Armenian, essentialist interpretations of Armenian ethnicity over the ages abound in Armenian historiography, and flourished particularly during the Soviet era, with examples such as S. A. Sardarian's Pervobytnoye obshchestvo v Amenii of 1967 which besides "numerous plagiarisms and mistakes" goes as far as to postulate a separate Armenian race native to the Armenian plateau, and attributes the invention of metallurgy to the Armenians (Kohl and  Tsetskhladze 1995). Heavily slanted depictions of Urartu are common in this literature. Armenian historical view must explain why Urartian epigraphy is in the non-Indo-European Urartian language. While there are reasonable scholarly scenarios that there was a Proto-Armenian component in Urartu, and that the early Armenians were the bona fide cultural heirs to Urartu, but the essentialist view of Armenian nationhood that simply equates Urartu with Armenia cannot be sustained (Kohl and  Tsetskhladze 1995).

Armenian Classic Era
In the Ottoman Empire, the social structure of  "Armenians" before the  18th century was based on the system of "Millet."

The Armenian millet was a confessional community in the Ottoman Empire. Confessional communities on local issues were functioning like the autonomous territories. The Ottoman millet specifically referred to the separate legal courts pertaining to personal law under which sections of the society were allowed to rule themselves with fairly little interference from the central system. Each millet was under the supervision of an Ethnarch ('national' leader), most often a religious hierarch. Armenian millet was under the Armenian Apostolic Church. The Millets had a great deal of power - they set their own laws and collected and distributed their own taxes. As the people of "The Book" Armenians were able to maintain their houses of worship, obtain religious literature, and employ clergy of their faith for their congregations. These were rights given in the local level. These rights become limited with the economic and technological developments of the 18th century. The Ottoman citizens wanted representation in national level. They wanted to have participation more than local level.

Armenian Renaissance 

Enlightenment among Armenians, sometimes called as renaissance of the Armenian people, came from two sources; First one was the Armenian monks belonging to the Mekhitarist Order. Second one was the socio-political developments of the 19th century, mainly "French Revolution" and establishment of "Russian revolutionary thought."

The 18th century generated new schools and libraries and chance to study in the universities of Western Europe for different elasticities of the Ottoman Empire. The initial aim of Protestant missionaries  were the conversion of the Muslims and Jews, they soon became involved with Protestant reformation of the Orthodox Armenians. From the first day when Rev. William Goodell settled in Constantinople in 1831 to the end of World War I, the missionaries made considerable contributions to the education of Armenians. They not only stressed elementary education, but established colleges and other institutions of learning. The notable institutions were (1)The Central College of Antep; (2) Euphrates College of Harpout; (3) Anatolia College at Marsovan; (4) Central Girls' College at Maras; (5) St. Paul's Institute at Tarsus. There were colleges, such as International College at Smyrna; American College for Girls, Syrian Protestant College at Beirut and Robert College, in which institutions many Armenian students received their education. Here they came into contact with the radical ideas of the Age of Enlightenment and the French Revolution. Educated and influential members of the large diaspora tried to transmit these ideas back to their own, with the double aim of raising their educational level and simultaneously strengthening their national identity. The European intellectual currents such as ideas of French revolution were transmitted through the 23,000 Armenian students within 127 Protestant congregations with 13,000 communicants, and 400 schools.

Mekhitarist Order had exclusive devotion to persons and things Armenian. Mekhitar, was born at Sebastia in Ottoman Empire in 1676. He entered a monastery, but was concerned about the level of culture and education in Armenia at that period, and sought to do something about it. Contacts with Western missionaries led him to become interested in translating material from the West into Armenian and setting up an order to facilitate education. Amongst their countrymen the influence of the Mekhitarist Order has been not only directive in the way of holiness and true service to God and the Church, but creative of a wholesome national ambition and self-respect. Apostles of culture and progress, they may be said, with strict justice, to have preserved from degradation and neglect the language and literature of their country, and in so doing, have been the saviors of the Armenian race. Father Ghevont Alishan was a member of the Mkhitarist Congregation in Venice. In 1885,  Armenian Patriotic Society of Europe appealed to him to create the first modern Armenian flag.  Alishan designed a flag inspired by the national Flag of France, identified today as the "Nationalist Armenian Flag."  Its colors were red, green, and blue respectively, representing the band of colors that Noah saw after landing on Mount Ararat.

In 1863, Ottoman Armenians were introduced to major reforms as an extension of Tanzimat.  Attempting to stem the tide of nationalist movements within the Ottoman Empire, Tanzimât period emerged from the minds of reformist sultans like Mahmud II and Abdülmecid I as well as prominent reformers who were European-educated bureaucrats.  The Armenian National Constitution (150 articles drafted by Nahabet Rusinian, Servichen, Nigoghos Balian, Krikor Odian and Krikor Margosian) defined the condition of Armenians in the Ottoman Empire, but also introduced  regulations defining the authority of the Patriarch. The "Armenian Constitution" and Armenian National Assembly was seen as a milestone by progressive Armenians.  Khrimian Hayrik worked to increase the influence of sub-councils of Armenian National Assembly. The Armenian National Assembly had a main council in Constantinople and sub-councils in the provincial centers. Main assembly consisted of 120 Armenian Nobles and 20 ecclesiastical members. The Assembly in capital meet very seldom. Local assemblies were deaf to the complaints of the poorer members of the community. In 1880 the wealthy and influential Armenians had no sympathy with the ideas of national independence or autonomy. They even signed an address of loyalty and devotion to the Sultan condemning the nationalist agitation as the work of misguided persons who have no authority or influence. This alienation from the center was highlighted by the work of bishop Mkrtich Khrimian. He worked to increase the influence of sub-councils of the towns of eastern Anatolia in the capital. Armenian National Assembly's policies aligned with the Anatolia with the increased influence of sub-councils. 1892 Khrimyan Hayrik was unanimously elected Catholicos of All Armenians. These two Ottoman reforms, which were theoretically perfect  examples of social change by law, brought serious stress over Ottoman political and administrative structure. Armenian Nobles (Amira) were not happy, and they were the owners of the economic system.

National Revival 

The Armenian national ideology developed long after the Greek movement, however the factors contributing to the emergence of Armenian nationalism made the movement far more similar to that of the Greeks than those of other ethnic groups. Unresolved social problems in the Empire began to feed Armenian national politics, along the other ethnic groups. As the Millet (Ottoman Empire) structure degraded, Armenians begin to rethink their position in the world. The Armenian subjects of the Empire influenced by the Armenian Diaspora and the network of congregations and schools of the Protestant missionaries throughout the Empire. After intervention in Russia in 1877-1878, Russian-Ottoman border brought new the political and military structure. The numbers of Circassians and Laz from the Russian Empire forcefully deported to Ottoman Empire. These emigrations brought tensions and changed the population distribution and balance of power within the local communities in eastern Anatolia. Russia became protectorate of Christian Armenians and this created a relatively more hostile environment to the Muslims (Kurds) who were left under Russian control. Kurdish-Armenian relations come to another turn. The newly established relations were complex. The change did not only effected the Armenian Millet but also the local non-tribal Kurds as well. The Kurdish tribal leaders that fled during the war began to express their power along the countryside. The region's social structure, coexistence of the communities was broken. The broken social structure required implementation of new reforms.

Kagik Ozanyan claims that Tanzimat regulations, helped the formation of an Armenian political strata and incited the Armenian national spirit, which was aligned with the nation building through revolution aligned with the French Revolution perspective. General Mayewski, who was the Russian Consul General to Ottoman Empire recorded the following

Civilization Perspective 

According to one position the breakdown of the "coexistence of the communities within the Ottoman Empire" was a direct result of the Christian Armenians and Muslims (Turks and Kurds) inability of living together. Armenian Patriarch Nerses Varjabedyan expresses his position to British Minister of Foreign Affairs, Lord Salisbury on April 13, 1878.

Most of the Ottoman sources do not give credit to these claims. They present the argument that the system of "Millet" and State and Religion preserved the Empire for centuries. A strong argument behind rejecting the "clash of civilizations" originated from the analysis of the activity timetable. The clashes collected in distinct events. Each event had high density with distinct beginning and an end. There was no single period that a thousand deaths were spread over a long period of time. This fact supports the "revolutionary view" instead of clash of civilizations, which showed the European powers the true nature of Ottoman rule. European powers needed to do something about these events through the international agreements. Assuredly Europe would do nothing if those thousand deaths were spread over years.

Armenian Question Perspective 

The Greeks were thus the first of the Ottoman Empire's subject peoples to secure recognition as an independent sovereign power. After a long and bloody struggle, and with the aid of the Great Powers, the Greek Revolution win independence for Greece from the Ottoman Empire granted by the Treaty of Constantinople in July 1832. National awakening of Bulgaria  and consequently liberation of Bulgaria originate after the events of the Russo-Turkish War of 1877-78 that led to the re-establishment of Bulgarian Sovereign state with the Treaty of San Stefano. There had been no considerable movement in behalf of Armenian independence before Abdul Hamid's time. There had been no Armenian political problem before the Treaty of Berlin, 1878. 1878 was marked for the down turn of relations between Armenians and Ottoman Empire.

The stipulation in favor of Armenian autonomy in the treaty of Berlin produced an immediate change. Unfortunately there were special difficulties for the realization of the so-called Ottoman liberal political program that could end with what article stipulated. For one thing not all the Armenians were under the Ottoman Empire. As the population considered, there was Armenians in the Russian Empire approaching to 900,000 at the nineteenth century. Ottoman subjects amounting perhaps to 1,200,000, were distributed through the six vilayets of Sivas, Bitlis, Erzerum, Harput, Diabekir, and Van. In some of these districts, they had the highest ethnic minority, among the Turks, Greeks, Assyrians, Jews, and Kurds but Armenians failed to represent more than %50 percent, a clear majority, in any district with which they were associated. Besides other difficulties, Armenians perceived the conditions of treaty (Article LXI) of Berlin as an early realization of their autonomy, if the powers should have proceeded straightway to enforce the Armenian provision. The rationalization of humanitarian intervention depended also to the Cyprus Convention besides the Treaty of Berlin, 1878. In 1879, one year of after the agreements, the only thing missing was the practical events to enable the articles for the demand of an Armenian state.

After the Armenian Massacres of 1894-1896 the Armenian population in the six vilayets, which were also the Kurdish regions, had a sharp decline somewhere between 80,000 and 300,000  and Armenian population in the conflict region drop to 900,000 from 1,200,000 before 1878. These massacres perpetuated by the Hamidieh soldier and European powers were asked to intervene. Instead of Armenian autonomy in these regions, Kurds (Kurdish tribal chiefs) retained much of their autonomy and power. The Abdulhamid made little attempt to alter the traditional power structure of “segmented, agrarian Kurish societies” – agha, shayk, and tribal chief. Because of their geographical position at the southern and eastern fringe of the empire and mountainous topography, and limited transportation and communication system. The state had little access to these provinces and were forced to make informal agreements with tribal chiefs, for instance the Ottoman qadi and mufti did not have jurisdiction over religious law which bolstered Kurdish authority and autonomy. The Armenian national movement had discovered through their revolutionary movement that neither Tsar Alexander II with his idealism nor Gladstone's Liberalism was a dependable hope.

The first effective intervention had come by the Woodrow Wilson who agreed to transfer what will be named as "Wilsonian Armenia" back to the Armenians in the Treaty of Sèvres.

Revolution Perspective

Ottoman Armenians educated with the European Way began to make attempts in forming organizations – secret societies, local groups, such as the 'Protectors of the Fatherland' (1881) which was established in Erzurum. Protectors of the Fatherland was almost certainly  affected by the ideas of French revolution and Greek Revolution as 'Freedom or Death' was their motto.

The Armenian national liberation movement gathered momentum with the establishment of Armenian Revolutionary Federation, Social Democrat Hunchakian Party and Armenakan (later named as Ramgavar). The Social Democrat Hunchakian Party (Hentchaks) had the goal to gain Armenia's independence from the Ottoman Empire. The Armenian Revolutionary Federation (ARF) originally aimed for autonomy of the Armenian-populated areas, which changed to establishment of Armenian state with the coming years. ARF adopted a decentralized modus operandi according to which the various chapters in different countries were allowed to plan and implement policies in tune with their local political atmosphere.

During 1880-1890 the local communication channels were developed. The organizations were fully functional under Ankara, Amasya, Çorum, Diyarbakır, Yozgat, and Tokat. In 1893 they began to use wall newspapers (newspapers like billboards) directed toward the non Armenian subjects.  The main theme of these materials were people should take control of their own life against the oppressors. These ideological communicants did not have any effect on the Muslims. These activities ended with clashes between revolutionaries and Ottoman police. Generally resulted with the jail time. Every jail time ended with official exchanges between Ottoman Empire and Britain, as it was the protectorate of the Educated revolutionaries who can print papers. It was more than probable' that Armenian revolutionaries were responsible parties in this conflict, Britain concluded. Sultan panicked, and local authorities act against them as they were cutting telegraph wires, bombing the odd government buildings. Britain or European powers concluded that however if there would be more interference these would end with religious fanaticism, and a civil war (massacres) would occur.

Armenians mainly lived in the intersection of three empires, Ottoman Empire, Russian Empire and Persian Empire. The Armenian diaspora, which lived in Europe mainly, was composed of the elite whom were being educated in European Universities or performing the trade. It was expected that revolutionary thinking would cover the three empires, not only inside (local forms such as "Protectors of the Fatherland") but also in Europe, such as Geneva. The Armenians in Europe (Armenian diaspora) began to hold meetings about their oppressed status leading to the foundation of parties that would formalize "national politics" under Armenakans, Hnchakians, and Armenian Revolutionary Federation with the coming years. These secret societies (or parties for some) which developed the "National Politics" stated goals as "freeing the Armenians from the Ottoman Empire by any means possible".  H. K. Vartanian wrote that the Armenian revolutionary movement was a direct and necessary response to the increasingly intolerable social, economic and political conditions of the 19th century decaying and declining Ottoman Empire.

Armenian national movement was clearly an international movement. However, practical center for Armenian revolutionaries was the Armenians in the Russian Empire, where Armenians could meet, organize funds, move the sources and materials to Ottoman Empire easily. The organization that was founded in Geneva (Europe), mostly by active Russian Armenians, took the idea of nationalism and gave it a clear imprint of Caucasian revolutionary thought in 1887. Caucasian revolutionary thought was directed at the Ottoman Empire, which the diaspora saw as its homeland. Young Armenia Society founded in 1889 by Kristapor Mikayelian within Caucasus become bigger with time. Young Armenia Society organized Fedayee campaigns into Ottoman territory.  The tsarist regime cracked down on any attempt by Russian Armenians to engage in action across the border, a leading example being the Gugunian Expedition of 1890.

The Bashkaleh Resistance was the first recorded bloody encounter between the Armenians and the Ottoman Empire in May 1889.

See also
Rise of nationalism under the Ottoman Empire

External links
James J. Reid. "Total War, the Annihilation Ethic, and the Armenian Genocide, 1870-1918"

References

Armenian nationalism
19th century in Armenia
19th century in the Ottoman Empire